Mount Powell is a mountain in the Uinta Mountains in Northeastern Utah and is the thirteenth highest summit in the state. The peak is named after USGS Director John Wesley Powell. The summit is in the High Uintas Wilderness and the Ashley National Forest.

References 

Mountains of Utah
Mountains of Summit County, Utah